Christopher Jonathan Ross (born 24 June 1954) is a former cricketer who played first-class and List A cricket in New Zealand and England from 1975 to 1980. He became a lawyer and is now a director of the Reserve Bank of New Zealand.

Life and career
Jonathan Ross was born in Warri, Nigeria, but was educated in New Zealand, where he attended Victoria University of Wellington, graduating with an LL.B (Hons). He was awarded a Rhodes Scholarship to attend Magdalen College, Oxford, where he earned a BA in Economics and Politics and a BCL.

A pace bowler, Ross represented New Zealand Universities and Wellington at cricket. At Oxford he played for the university team from 1978 to 1980. In 1980 he was the captain of Oxford University in its first-class matches and of the Combined Universities team in the Benson & Hedges Cup. His best first-class figures were 4 for 34 for Oxford University against Worcestershire in 1978. His best List A figures were 3 for 31 for Wellington against the touring Indians in 1975-76.

Ross is a corporate, capital markets and financial services lawyer. He was a partner with the leading New Zealand law firm Bell Gully for 23 years until he retired in 2011. He is a non-executive director of the Reserve Bank of New Zealand, as well as of other companies.

References

External links
 
 Jonathan Ross at CricketArchive

1949 births
Living people
People from Warri
Victoria University of Wellington alumni
Alumni of Magdalen College, Oxford
New Zealand Rhodes Scholars
English cricketers
Wellington cricketers
Oxford University cricketers
British Universities cricketers
20th-century New Zealand lawyers
New Zealand bankers
21st-century New Zealand lawyers